Einstein is a German-Jewish surname. "Ein stein" is German for "a rock". It is strongly associated with German-born American physicist Albert Einstein. People with the surname include:

Albert Einstein (1879–1955)
Einstein family, including:
Mileva Einstein (née Marić) (1875–1948), Serbian physicist and mathematician, first wife of Albert Einstein
Hans Albert Einstein (1904–1973), Swiss-American engineer, son of Albert and Mileva
Bernhard Caesar Einstein (1930–2008), German-American physicist, son of Hans Albert Einstein, grandson of Albert Einstein
Thomas Helmut Einstein (born 1955), anesthesiologist and physician, son of Bernhard Caesar Einstein, great-grandson of Albert Einstein
Eduard Einstein (1910–1965), second son of Albert and Mileva
Elsa Einstein (1876–1936), cousin and second wife of Albert Einstein 
Hans Einstein (1923–2012), physician, grandson of a first cousin of Albert Einstein
Alfred Einstein (1880–1952), musicologist and distant cousin of Albert Einstein

Others 
 An American entertainment family:
 Harry Einstein (1904–1958), comedian and writer, and father of:
 Bob Einstein (1942–2019), actor best known for portraying Super Dave Osborne
 Albert Einstein, professionally known as Albert Brooks (born 1947), actor
 Arik Einstein (1939–2013), Israeli singer
 Carl Einstein (1885–1940), author and art critic
 Edwin Einstein (1842–1905), U.S. congressperson from Massachusetts
 Hannah Bachman Einstein (1862–1929), American social worker and activist
 Izzy Einstein (c. 1880–1938), American police officer
 Lewis Einstein (1887–1967), American diplomat and historian
 Napoleon Einstein (born 1989), Indian cricketer
 Siegbert Einstein (1889–1968), German civil servant and politician
 Siegfried Einstein (1919–1983), German writer

Jewish surnames
German-language surnames
Yiddish-language surnames